Oscar Goldman (1925 – 17 December 1986, Bryn Mawr) was an American mathematician, who worked on algebra and its applications to number theory.

Oscar Goldman received his Ph.D in 1948 under Claude Chevalley at Princeton University. He was chair of the Mathematics Department at Brandeis University from 1952 to 1960. As chair of the department his immediate successor was Maurice Auslander.

In 1962, Goldman left Brandeis to become a professor and chair of the mathematics department at the University of Pennsylvania. Murray Gerstenhaber and Chung Tao Yang had persuaded Provost David R. Goddard to hire Goldman to help improve the quality of U. Penn's mathematics department to the level of the mathematics departments of the University of Chicago, Harvard University, and Princeton University. From 1963 to 1967, Goldman served as the chair of the mathematics department of U. Penn., hired several outstanding mathematicians including Richard Kadison and Eugenio Calabi, and regularly consulted Saunders Mac Lane and Donald C. Spencer in making his decisions on hiring and curriculum improvements.

Goldman was shot and wounded on February 11, 1970, at the University of Pennsylvania campus by disgruntled student Robert Cantor, who also shot and killed professor Walter Koppelman before killing himself. Goldman ultimately recovered from his wounds.

Publications
 
 
 
 with Maurice Auslander: 
 with Maurice Auslander:

See also
 Goldman domain

References

External links

20th-century American mathematicians
1925 births
1986 deaths
Princeton University alumni
Brandeis University faculty
University of Pennsylvania faculty
Mathematicians at the University of Pennsylvania
Algebraists
American shooting survivors